Wolman and Wohlman is a surname. Notable people with the surname include:

Abel Wolman (1892–1989), American inventor, scientist, professor and pioneer of modern sanitary engineering
Al Wohlman, film and theatre actor, vaudeville performer
Amnon Wolman (born 1955), composes music and texts for miscellaneous instruments along with the computer
Baron Wolman (born 1937), American photographer best known for his work for the music magazine Rolling Stone
Dan Wolman (born 1941), Israeli film director
David Wolman, American author and journalist
Gil J. Wolman (1929–1995), French artist from Paris
Harriet Wolman, Canadian former politician and administrator in Ontario, Canada
Jerry Wolman (born 1927), former Washington, D.C. developer and the former owner of the Philadelphia Eagles football team
Leo Wolman (1890–1961), noted American economist whose work focused on labor economics
M. Gordon Wolman (1924–2010), American geographer
Moshe Wolman (1914–2009), Israeli neuropathologist, born in Warsaw, then part of the Russian Empire
William Wolman, longtime chief economist at BusinessWeek magazine, and a frequent commentator on CNBC
Zachary Wohlman (1988–2021), American professional boxer

See also
Wolman disease, rare genetic disorder caused by a deficiency of an enzyme known as lysosomal acid lipase (LAL or LIPA)